The Munster GAA Hurling Minor Championship (known for sponsorship reasons as the Electric Ireland Munster GAA Hurling Minor Championship) is an annual inter-county hurling competition organised by the Munster Council of the Gaelic Athletic Association (GAA). It is the highest inter-county hurling competition for male players under the age of 17 in the province of Munster, and has been contested every year since the 1928 championship. 

The final, usually held on the first Sunday in July, serves as the culmination of a series of games played during May and June, and the results determine which team receives the TWA Cup. The championship was previously played on a straight knockout basis whereby once a team lost they were eliminated from the championship, however, as of 2018 the championship will use a round-robin system.

The Munster Championship is an integral part of the wider GAA Hurling All-Ireland Minor Championship. The winners of the Munster final, like their counterparts in the Leinster Championship, are rewarded by advancing directly to the semi-final stage of the All-Ireland series of games. The losers of the Munster final enter the All-Ireland series at the quarter-final group stage.

Five teams currently participate in the Munster Championship. Two of the most successful teams in the championship, namely Cork and Tipperary, play their provincial hurling in the Munster Championship. Between them, these teams have won the provincial title on 72 occasions while they have also claimed 38 All-Ireland titles.

The title has been won at least once by all six of the Munster counties, five of which have won the title more than once. The all-time record-holders are Tipperary, who have won the competition 39 times. Cork are the current champions.

History

Development

Since 1887 the Munster Senior Championship had provided inter-county games for adult males. This was supplemented by the creation of the Munster Junior Championship in 1910 which provided a springboard to develop players before progressing to senior level. The Munster Minor Championship was the third championship to be created and was aimed at developing younger players who were under the age of 18.

Beginnings

The inaugural Munster Championship featured Clare, Cork, Limerick, Tipperary and Waterford. Limerick and Waterford contested the first match on Sunday 15 July 1928. Played in Thurles Sportsfield as the curtain raiser to the senior final, Waterford claimed a seven-point victory in the inaugural game. Even though there were only four games down for decision, the championship took nearly 11 months to complete. On Sunday 2 June 1929, the very first Munster final took place. Cork won their first title after a 3-04 to 3-02 defeat of Waterford. Since then the championship title has been awarded every year except for a three-year period during the Emergency.

Team changes

Due to a lack of competition in the various Connacht Championships, a proposal by the Galway County Board led to a wider debate regarding hurling. At a meeting of the Munster Council on 10 January 1959 it was decided to invite Galway to participate in all grades of hurling in Munster on a temporary basis. This decision was later ratified at the GAA Congress. Galway played in the Munster Championship from 1959 until 1969 and reached the 1966 final where they lost to Cork.

Format

Between 1928 and 2002 the Munster Championship was a knockout tournament whereby once a team was defeated they were eliminated from the championship. In the early years the pairings were drawn at random and there was no seeding. Each match was played as a single leg. If a match ended in a draw there was a replay. Drawn replays were settled with extra time; however, if both sides were still level at the end of extra time a second replay took place and so on until a winner was found. Extra-time was eventually adopted in the event of a draw for all championship games except the final. In 2003 a play-off format was adopted which gave the defeated first-round teams a second chance to progress to the semi-finals.

The Munster Championship was an integral part of the All-Ireland Senior Hurling Championship. Between 1928 and 1996 the Munster final winners automatically qualified for either the All-Ireland semi-final or final. The introduction of the "back door" system in 1997 allowed the defeated Munster finalists access to the All-Ireland quarter-final, while the Munster champions received a bye to the All-Ireland semi-final.

Current format

Championship

There are five teams in the Munster Championship. During the course of a season (from May to June) each team plays the others once (a single round-robin system) for a total of 10 games. Teams receive two points for a win and one point for a draw. No points are awarded for a loss. Teams are ranked by total points and then head-to-head results. The top two teams in the group contest the Munster final.

Qualification for the All-Ireland Championship

As of the 2018 championship qualification for the All-Ireland Championship has changed due to the introduction of a quarter-final group stage The Munster champions continue to receive a bye to the All-Ireland semi-final while the defeated Munster finalists enter the All-Ireland quarter-finals.

Venues

Group stage

Fixtures in the five group stage rounds of the championship are played at the home ground of one of the two teams. Each team is guaranteed two home games. These games will be played as curtain raisers to their corresponding senior fixtures.

Final

The final has historically been played at either Semple Stadium, Páirc Uí Chaoimh or the Gaelic Grounds. As of the 2018 championship, the final will be played at one of these venues as per the home and away agreements between Cork, Limerick and Tipperary at senior level.

Managers

Managers in the Munster Championship are involved in the day-to-day running of the team, including the training, team selection, and sourcing of players from the club championships. Their influence varies from county-to-county and is related to the individual county boards. The manager is assisted by a team of two or three selectors and an extensive backroom team consisting of various coaches. Prior to the development of the concept of a manager in the 1970s, teams were usually managed by a team of selectors with one member acting as chairman.

Trophy and medals

The TWA Cup is the current prize for winning the championship. The cup was presented by Trans World Airlines at Shannon Airport in 1946. Prior to this, several different cups and trophies had been presented to winning captains.

Traditionally, the victory presentation takes place at a special rostrum in the main grandstand. The cup is decorated with ribbons in the colours of the winning team. During the game the cup actually has both teams' sets of ribbons attached and the runners-up ribbons are removed before the presentation. The winning captain accepts the cup on behalf of his team before giving a short speech. Individual members of the winning team then have an opportunity to come to the rostrum to lift the cup, which is held by the winning team until the following year's final. 

In accordance with GAA rules, the Munster Council awards up to twenty-six gold medals to the winners of the Munster final.

General statistics

Performance by county

Biggest Munster final wins
 The most one sided Munster finals:
 33 points – 1950: Tipperary 12–3 (39) – (6) 2–0 Clare
 32 points – 1952: Tipperary 10–7 (37) – (5) 1–2 Clare
 32 points – 1945: Tipperary 8–10 (34) – (2) 0–2 Clare
 31 points – 1938: Cork 9–4 (31) – (0) 0–0 Kerry
 25 points – 1939: Cork 8–3 (27) – (2) 0–2 Clare
 24 points – 1956: Tipperary 10–10 (40) – (16) 4–4 Waterford
 24 points – 1955: Tipperary 8–11 (35) – (11) 2–5 Waterford
 24 points – 1929: Waterford 7–5 (26) – (2) 0–2 Tipperary
 23 points – 1961: Tipperary 7–11 (32) – (9) 1–9 Cork
 23 points – 1940: Limerick 8–3 (27) – (4) 0–4 Clare

List of Munster Finals

Notes:
 1974 - The first match ended in a draw: Cork 3-07, Tipperary 2-10.
 1986 - The first match ended in a draw: Cork 3-10, Tipperary 2-13.
 1992 - The first match ended in a draw: Waterford 4-07, Tipperary 3-10.
 2022 - Tipperary won 3-0 on penalties.

Records and statistics

Teams

By decade

The most successful team of each decade, judged by number of Munster Minor Hurling Championship titles, is as follows:

1920s: 1 each for Cork (1929) and Waterford (1929)
1930s: 6 for Tipperary (1930-31-32-33-34-35)
1940s: 4 for Tipperary (1945-46-47-49)
1950s: 8 for Tipperary (1950-52-53-54-55-56-57-59)
1960s: 5 for Cork (1964-66-67-68-69)
1970s: 8 for Cork (1970-71-72-74-75-77-78-79)
1980s: 4 for Tipperary (1980-82-83-87)
1990s: 5 for Tipperary (1991-93-96-97-99)
2000s: 5 for Cork (2000-04-05-06-08)
2010s: 4 for Tipperary (2012-15-16-18)

Gaps

The longest gaps between successive Munster titles:

44 years: Waterford (1948–1992)
29 years: Limerick (1984–2013)
21 years: Clare (1989–2010)
19 years: Waterford (1929–1948)
19 years: Limerick (1965–1984)
18 years: Limerick (1940–1958)
17 years: Waterford (1992–2009)
13 years: Cork (1951–1964)
11 years: Tipperary (1962–1973)
10 years: Tipperary (1935–1945)
10 years: Cork (1941–1951)

Top scorers

Overall

Single game

Finals

References

Sources
 Roll of Honour on www.gaainfo.com
 Complete Roll of Honour on Kilkenny GAA bible

Munster GAA inter-county hurling competitions